Centennial Campus is a research park and educational campus owned and operated by North Carolina State University in Raleigh, North Carolina, United States. Composed of two locations, the  property provides office and lab space for corporate, governmental and not-for-profit entities, in addition to providing space for 75 university research centers, institutes, laboratories and departmental units. Currently,  of constructed space has been built. Upon completion, Centennial Campus is anticipated to have  of constructed space.

In addition to holding office and lab buildings, Centennial Campus also has the Lonnie Poole Golf Course, a public fishing pier and lake (Lake Raleigh), greenway, disc golf course, and residential living options, including townhomes, apartments and condos. Centennial Campus is also home to the Dorothy and Roy Park Alumni Center.

Location
Centennial Campus is located just south of NC State's main campus in Raleigh, bordering Avent Ferry Road and Centennial Parkway.

History
The first tract of land  was turned over to NC State University in 1984 by North Carolina Governor James B. Hunt, Jr.  The land was originally part of the state-owned mental health facility, Dorothea Dix Hospital. Another  was turned over to NC State in 1985 by Governor James G. Martin. After the development of a Master Plan under the direction of Claude McKinney, dean of the School of Design, the first building was completed and occupied in 1989. The first corporate tenant, ABB, moved in during 1991. That same year, the College of Textiles moved to Centennial Campus.  In 2000, the Centennial Biomedical Campus was established.  Beginning in 2002, the College of Engineering began to relocate to Centennial Campus

Notable buildings
The James B. Hunt Jr. Library, which was completed in late 2012 and opened in January 2013, is the main library for Centennial Campus. The  Hunt Library, named for former N.C. Governor James B. Hunt Jr., was proposed partially to alleviate overcrowded conditions in university library spaces. It also houses an automated book retrieval system, called the "BookBot," and the Institute for Emerging Issues (IEI), a public-policy organization. The NC General Assembly approved funding for the new library in 2007.

Also under construction is the  Randall B. Terry, Jr. Companion Animal Veterinary Medical Center.  The Keystone Centennial Science Center, a  lab and office space complex, as well as Engineering Building III, were completed during the summer of 2010.

Funding sources for buildings
Buildings on Centennial Campus are funded in four ways: (1) state-appropriated funds; (2) university revenue bonds; (3) private development and (4) private fund raising.

Awards
Centennial Campus was named “Outstanding Research Park” in 2007 by the Association of University Research Parks (AURP) and has received worldwide recognition for its leadership in innovation through public-private partnerships.

Colleges
Three of NC State’s colleges have a major physical presence on Centennial Campus – the Wilson College of Textiles, College of Engineering and the College of Veterinary Medicine. In addition, the Graduate School and the College of Engineering's Golden LEAF Biomanufacturing Training and Education Center (BTEC) are located on the campus. During the academic year, approximately 3,400 students attend classes on the campus.  With the completion of Fitts-Woolard Hall, a 225,000-square-foot engineering innovation hub, Centennial Campus now includes the university's entire engineering academic and research offerings.

Partners and tenants 
About 75 corporate, government and not-for-profit organizations are located on Centennial Campus. In order to lease space on the property, a prospective "partner" must have some programmatic connection to NC State, such as collaborative research with a faculty member or the use of students for internships or part-time work. Currently, about one-third of the partners are start-up or early stage companies, many located in Centennial's co-working incubator, Raleigh Founded. Another 20% are research and development units of large corporations and the rest are small businesses, state and federal agencies, and non-profits. Current partners include, Hitachi Energy, U.S. Department of Agriculture, IBM, LexisNexis and the National Weather Service's regional office. Centennial Campus is also home to the Centennial Campus Magnet Middle School, a Wake County public magnet school with 600 students.

Points of Interest

Research & training facilities
Centennial Campus houses the Golden LEAF Biomanufacturing Training and Education Center (BTEC) and the Friday Institute for Innovative Education. BTEC provides education and training in biomanufacturing and bioprocessing involving simulated cGMP production of high-value biomolecules using cell growth and expression, recovery and purification processes. The Friday Institute conducts educational research, develops educational resources, provides professional development programs for educators, and acts as an advocate to improve teaching and learning. Centennial Campus is also home to the FREEDM Systems Center, one of the latest Gen-III Engineering Research Centers (ERC) established by the National Science Foundation in 2008 to develop technology to integrate the nation's power grid with renewable electrical energy technologies.  Finally, Centennial Campus is home to the Larry K. Monteith Engineering Research Center, which houses several clean rooms.

Engineering Oval
The College of Engineering houses all of its engineering buildings on Centennial Campus.

The first two of six university-owned housing buildings on the Oval, called "Wolf Ridge," and a university dining facility opened in August 2013.

The Engineering Oval is an oval-shaped courtyard bounded by five Engineering Buildings, the James B. Hunt Jr. Library, and University Housing and Dining facilities.

Lonnie Poole Golf Course
The Lonnie Poole Golf Course is a par-71, 7,025-yard golf course designed by The Palmer Course Design Company.  In addition to serving as a public golf course, the Lonnie Poole Golf Course is also home to the NC State men's and women's golf teams.  The golf course opened to the public in 2009.

References

External links
 
 Guide to Centennial Campus Photographs, 1979-2000
 Guide to Centennial Campus Records, 1974-2005
 Guide to Centennial Campus Oral Histories 2006
 Association of University Research Parks (AURP)
 International Association of Science Parks (IASP)
 Research Triangle Park
 National Science Foundation
 FREEDM Systems Center
 College of Veterinary Medicine
 College of Engineering
 Wilson College of Textiles
 Golden LEAF Biomanufacturing Training and Education Center (BTEC)
 Lonnie Poole Golf Course

North Carolina State University
Neighborhoods in Raleigh, North Carolina
Science parks in the United States
Economy of Raleigh, North Carolina
North Carolina State University Centennial Campus
Business parks of the United States
High-technology business districts in the United States